2CH was a commercial radio station in Sydney, Australia. It was owned by Pacific Star Network. The station changed formats on 10 June 2022 to sports.

History

2CH commenced broadcasting on 15 February 1932 on 1210 kHz. It moved to its final AM frequency of 1170 kHz in 1935.

Ownership 
The CH stands for "churches". In 1944, the NSW Council of Churches sub-let the licence to Amalgamated Wireless (Australasia) who provided program content for six days per week, with the Council of Churches being responsible for programming on Sundays. The NSW Council of Churches was its licence holder until it was sold to John Singleton in April 1994 becoming part of the Macquarie Radio Network.

In January 2017, 2CH was sold to a consortium of Oceania Capital Partners, Glenn Wheatley and John Williams for $5.6 million. The station had to be sold to comply with an undertaking given to the Australian Communications and Media Authority following the merger of the Macquarie Radio Network and Fairfax Media (owners of 2GB and 2UE respectively) to comply with legislation allowing one party to only control two radio stations in a market.

The station posted a loss of $1.9 million on revenue of $2.4 million for the year to March 2019 In June 2020, it was sold for $11 million to Pacific Star Network.

Church Thanksgiving
On 18 February 2007, a thanksgiving service to celebrate 2CH's 75 years of broadcasting was held at St Andrew's Anglican Cathedral, Sydney Square, commencing at 2 pm. The Reverend Peter Jensen, the Anglican Archbishop of Sydney presided with Rev. Dr. Ross Clifford preaching.

Transition to 'DAB+ only' radio station 
2CH was heard on DAB+ radio until 10 June 2022, after briefly simulcasting on DAB+ and 1170 kHz in the AM broadcast band. The station used be live-streamed over the internet until the station demise.

Although not the first 'DAB+ only' radio station in Australia, 2CH was probably the first to transition by relinquishing its AM radio frequency allocation.

Trevor Sinclair broadcast his final show on the AM broadcast band from Midday-7pm on 22 October 2020. Chris Kearns broadcast his show on both AM and DAB+ until Midnight 22 October 2020, when the AM frequency 1170 kHz was taken over by 1170 SEN, carrying a dedicated sports broadcasting network, known as the Sports Entertainment Network.
At 6pm on 10 June 2022, 2CH left the airwaves for the final time with Jane Nield as the last live announcer.

Announcers

Previous Line-up
 
Weekdays:
 Non Stop Classic Hits (12:00am – 6:00am)
 Tim Webster (6:00am – 12:00pm)
 Jane Nield (12:00pm – 6:00pm)
 Nay Pearce (6:00pm – 12:00am)
 
Saturdays:
 Non Stop Classic Hits (12:00am – 6:00am)
 Matt Pardy (6:00am – 10:00am)
 John Tamb (10:00am – 2:00pm)
 Michael Loughnan (2:00pm – 6:00pm)
 Eddie Olek (6:00pm – 12:00am)
 
Sundays:
 Non Stop Classic Hits (12:00am – 6:00am)
 Matt Pardy (6:00am – 10:00am)
 John Tamb (10:00am – 2:00pm)
 Michael Loughnan (2:00pm – 6:00pm)
 Roy Orbison Show (6:00pm - 7:00pm)
 Elvis Presley Show (7:00pm – 8:00pm)
 The Beatles Show (8:00pm – 9:00pm)
 Aaron Savakis (9:00pm – 12:00am)
 
Veteran radio presenter Bob Rogers worked at the station, from 1995 until he retired in early October 2020, at the age of 93.

References

External links

Media at Wikimedia Commons under Category: 2CH
Radio Heritage Foundation - 2CH in 1946

Oldies radio stations in Australia
Easy listening radio stations in Australia
Pacific Star Network
Radio stations established in 1932
Radio stations in Sydney

1932 establishments in Australia
Radio stations disestablished in 2022
2CH